Panama competed at the 2004 Summer Paralympics in Athens, Greece. The team included two athletes, one man and one woman. Said Gomez won the nation's only medal at the Games, a silver in the men's 5000 metres T13 track event.

Medallists

Sports

Athletics

Men's track

Swimming

See also
Panama at the Paralympics
Panama at the 2004 Summer Olympics

References 

Nations at the 2004 Summer Paralympics
2004
Summer Paralympics